The St Mungo Community Housing Association, working as St Mungo's, is a charity registered in England to help homeless people.

Soup run
St.Mungo's Community began as a splinter group from The Simon Community which was started by a former probation officer Anton Wallich-Clifford and was unique among organisations for its success in alcoholic recoveries. This was essentially due to its controversial approach of allowing drinking actually on the premises.
The lease for the East End shelter in Sclater street was ending and it was at a time when shortage of money drove the Simon Community into constant reorganisation. However, due to the good services of an MP James Allason, the chairman of the East End house managed to break through the almost impenetrable bureaucracy that surrounded the London County Council. Unaware that it was for a new charity they offered the short lease on a house in Home Road, Wandsworth, which was due to be demolished in two years time. It was unfortunate that once it was realised that St.Mungos was not yet even registered as a charity the young employee who completed the actual arrangement was sacked. 
Harry Stone had a choice of two people for the job of warden, one was the current warden of the closing Simon wet house the other a young ambitious worker at the Simon headquarters. The current warden was a reformed alcoholic and it was therefore felt he might not be able to withstand the considerable pressure he would almost certainly be under. So it was a fortunate gamble that Jim Horne was chosen. Jim was already acquainted with Geoffrey Fernyhough who had been managing director of the Green Line coaches and he agreed to become the new Chairman while Harry Stone became secretary. treasurer. and fund raiser. Jim ridiculed the suggestion the enterprise should be called The Home Road Hostel and pressed for the name St.Mungo’s.  Being Scottish, he believed the powers of Glasgow Cathedral might be persuaded to make an ample donation if it was named after their patron saint. Unfortunately it proved to be a false hope. But otherwise Jim’s enthusiasm and ability drove St. Mungo to a sure start and onwards with ever increasing success. Among his early helpers was Graham Parr who in turn broke away to start up the original Vauxhall Broadway hostel.
Due to the enlightened support of Wandsworth Council, even though they had never been officially informed of the occupation in Home Road, the Mayor opened the second house, which was also in Home Road.
 
It was not long before St. Mungos gained the interest of the Department of Health and Social Services and Jim inveigled the Head of the Department and even the Minister Sir Keith Joseph to spend an evening on the soup run. Even so it was a surprise when the department suddenly offered major financial support so that the Community could become an experimental embryo for further possible development. The amateur management had up to that time worked along unconventional lines. The Trustees had given Jim considerable licence over some of his machinations. So it had to be completely reorganised. Qualified accountants, medical practitioners and psychiatrists were appointed as additional trustees. Out of this it soon became clear that whenever either of the original Trustees held opposing views or questioned Jim’s dealings, the new Trustees, quite correctly, backed Jim since he had the responsibility for the daily running.

In the late 1960s, it faltered. Its management started cutting back and so, in May 1969, its soup run was to be ended. The soup run was a nightly distribution of soup in six locations in London's West End where homeless rough sleepers or "dossers" gathered. This was provided by Wandsworth Council for a nominal rent and in 1970, the council provided three more houses nearby. The fourth house was used as an office by the developing organisation.

Hostels

A large hostel, accommodating up to 200 people, was started in a disused Marmite factory in Vauxhall in 1973. This large building had previously been notorious for the strong smell of the production process. In the same year, another large hostel was opened on a short-life basis in Suffolk Street, off the Strand, formerly the Charing Cross Hospital. The hospital had been relocated to Fulham and Jim Horne negotiated cheap terms for occupation of the old building with the Greater London Council pending its conversion to a police station.

There was a schism in the organisation in 1979. Jim Horne left and the organisation split into three. The Charing Cross hostel was managed by a new charity — St Mungo's Community Housing Association until closed due to its insanitary condition and replaced by a refurbished building in Endell Street, Covent Garden. The Marmite hostel became Bondway Shelter, registered as a separate housing association. The St Mungo's Community Trust then focussed upon the soup run and partnered with other organisations, such as the Shepherd's Bush Housing Association, to open a hostel in Fulham. In 1980, the soup run was passed on to the Bondway organisation and the original trust now operates as Hestia Housing and Support. It was renamed to avoid confusion with the St Mungo's Community Housing Association, which operates as "St Mungo's".

Today St Mungo's has grown and developed a wide range of services becoming the largest charity dealing with the homeless in London. In 2010, it provided a bed for over 1500 people each night. By 2011, they managed over a hundred sites across southern England providing accommodation in hostels, group houses and independent units or offering other services to the homeless.

Projects

The charity has pioneered a variety of novel programmes and initiatives.

"Bricks and Mortar" and "ReVive" training programmes

Bricks and Mortar provides the homeless with training and experience of bricklaying. ReVive is a similar scheme which develops other building skills such as plastering and decorating.

"LifeWorks" project

The LifeWorks project started in 2008, providing psychodynamics psychotherapy to homeless people, especially those who are addicted to drugs or alcohol.

"Putting Down Roots" project

The Putting Down Roots project enables the homeless and hostel dwellers to develop gardens and other horticultural features. It was started by Martin Snowden for St Mungo's in 2000 and has been sponsored and supported by a variety of partners. In 2012, it was still going strong with Jonathan Trustram leading the development of gardens at St John's Church, Waterloo and other places.

Street stories

In 2009, for the 40th anniversary of the organisation, a project was started to record the oral history of the homeless. Six clients were given training in this and they then interviewed other clients, recording the history of their time on the streets and other recollections. These were then presented in an exhibition at the LSE and the results were then archived in Southwark Library.

Controversy 
In March 2018, St Mungo's revealed to the Guardian newspaper that it had cooperated with Home Office immigration, compliance and enforcement (ICE) teams, who are responsible for identifying rough sleepers who were deemed as living in the UK illegally, even EU citizens who are lawful migrants. Other organisation in the charitable sector criticised St Mungo's involvement with the ICE teams. The North East London Migrant Action group said: “The role of homelessness charities should be to uphold the rights of vulnerable people. St Mungo’s have forfeited the trust of asylum seekers and other migrants who sleep rough by working with the Home Office who have people deported from the UK'.

While acknowledging that their outreach teams had worked with the Home Office, St Mungo's responded that their role was to protect the rights of the homeless: "We took the decision that it was better to be there to provide support to vulnerable people sleeping rough than not be able to advocate for them at these times. Our role should not be confused with that of enforcement agencies."

References

External links
"Our history of helping homeless people", a history of the current St Mungo's
40 year history History of Hestia, the original St Mungo's Community Trust
A history of Thames Reach and homelessness in London, the successor to the Bondway spin-off
About the Simon community, which started the original soup run and has now restarted such outreach projects

Homelessness charities in the United Kingdom
Homeless shelters in the United Kingdom